Bokhat Alvan (also Romanized as Bokhāt ʿAlvān) is a village in Ahudasht Rural District, Shavur District, Shush County, Khuzestan Province, Iran. At the 2006 census, its population was 99, in 18 families.

References 

Populated places in Shush County